Harchin is a village in Laspur upper Chitral District, Khyber Pakhtunkhwa Province of Pakistan. In 1998 it had a population of 1,490.

Educational Institutions
Govt Higher Secondary School Harchin Chitral

See also
Laspur
Orghoch
Gahirat

References

Chitral District
Tehsils of Chitral District
Union councils of Khyber Pakhtunkhwa
Populated places in Chitral District
Union councils of Chitral District